First Beeline Buses, trading as First Berkshire & The Thames Valley, is a bus operator providing services in and around Slough. It is a subsidiary of FirstGroup.

History

In January 1986 Alder Valley North Limited, later renamed, The Berks Bucks Bus Company took over the Bracknell, High Wycombe, Maidenhead, Newbury, Reading and Wokingham operations of Alder Valley as part of the preparation for privatisation of the National Bus Company, trading as "Beeline" once the name was changed in October 1986. In late 1987 The Berks Bucks Bus Company was sold to Q Drive.

In 1990 the High Wycombe operations were sold to the Oxford Bus Company, and in 1992 the Reading and Newbury operations were sold to Reading Buses. In 1993 Beeline purchased the Slough operations of Luton & District Transport, until 1986 the Slough depot of London Country Bus Services and later part of the London Country North West division.

In March 1996 Beeline was sold to CentreWest who in turn was sold to FirstGroup in March 1997. Initially trading as First Beeline, in 2001 it was rebranded as First Berkshire & The Thames Valley.

Following the loss of nine Bracknell Forest Council supported services to Courtney Buses on 13 July 2015 and the sale of route 90 Bracknell to Reading to Reading Buses on 26 July 2015, the Bracknell garage closed on 28 August 2015.

Services
The company currently operates services in Slough, as well as services to surrounding areas such as Heathrow Airport, High Wycombe. The company was previously the dominant operator in Maidenhead, but town services there were abandoned in 2004 and are now run by Thames Valley Buses.

As well as normal First branded services, there were five specially branded groups of routes. Some routes to Heathrow Airport were run with blue Heathrow 7 Series Mercedes-Benz O530 Citaros and have been using Volvo 7900 Hybrids. Some routes in Slough were branded as Slough Trading Estate Hoppa, and used red liveried Optare Solos, but these vehicles were transferred away from Slough in 2014 and several routes through the Trading Estate have been abandoned. The Legoland Shuttle is run with yellow buses in Legoland graphics. However, this was abandoned in late 2017.

A new service, route 100, started on 2 June 2012, linking tourist destinations close to Windsor. However, this service no longer operates.

Coach services are also run under different brands. The Reading to Heathrow service are branded as RailAir, and routes 701 and 702 as Green Line. Operation of the Green Line services transferred to Reading Buses in December 2017.

Other services
First Berkshire & The Thames Valley operated American Blue Bird school buses from an outstation in Chertsey for schools around Runnymede.

The company also used to operate Ride Pegasus!, a larger scheme run under contract to Surrey County Council from an outstation in Merrow, Guildford. This ceased in July 2010 after the council cut the funding.

Fleet summary
As at August 2017 the fleet consisted of 98 buses and coaches.

Gallery

See also
 List of bus operators of the United Kingdom

References

External links

 First Berkshire & The Thames Valley website
 First Group website
 First Berkshire gallery

FirstGroup bus operators in England
Transport in Berkshire